The Balleny Trough is an undersea trough named in association with the Balleny Islands. The name was approved by the Advisory Committee for Undersea Features in February 1972.

References
 

Oceanic basins of the Southern Ocean
Balleny Islands